Marian High School is a private, Roman Catholic high school for girls in Bloomfield Township, Michigan in Metro Detroit. Marian High School is located next to Brother Rice High School, an all-male Catholic high school in the Roman Catholic Archdiocese of Detroit.

History
Marian High School, founded in 1959, is sponsored by the Sisters, Servants of the Immaculate Heart of Mary. In 2014, Marian High School fired Barbara Webb, a lesbian chemistry teacher, for becoming pregnant via IVF.

Academics
Accredited by the North Central Association, the academic program provides college preparatory classes, 19 honors classes, and 16 Advanced Placement courses.

Demographics
The demographic breakdown of the 493 girls enrolled in 2013-14 was:

Native American/Alaskan - 0.2%
Asian/Pacific islanders - 1.4%
Black - 5.7%
Hispanic - 1.4%
White - 89.1%
Multiracial - 2.2%

Athletics
The interscholastic athletic teams, known as the Mustangs, participate in the Catholic High School League. Blue and gold are the school's colors. The following MHSAA sanctioned sports are offered:

Basketball
State champions - 1988, 1992, 1996, 1998, 2014, 2015
Bowling
Cross country 
Golf
2019, 2020
Lacrosse 
Skiing 
State champions - 2010, 2011, 2014
Soccer
State champions - 2003, 2004, 2009, 2010, 2012, 2017, 2018, 2019, 2021
Softball
Swimming and diving
State champions - 2007, 2008, 2014
Tennis
State champions - 2010, 2013, 2015
Track and field
Volleyball
State champions - 2009, 2010, 2020

Notable alumni
Mary Kay Henry, Class of 1975; International President of SEIU
Madison Packer, Class of 2010; Professional ice hockey player

Notes and references

External links

 Marian High School website

Roman Catholic Archdiocese of Detroit
Girls' schools in Michigan
Catholic secondary schools in Michigan
Bloomfield Hills, Michigan
Schools in Bloomfield Township, Oakland County, Michigan
Educational institutions established in 1959
High schools in Oakland County, Michigan
1959 establishments in Michigan